Büyükyoncalı is a town in Saray district  of Tekirdağ Province, Turkey. The population of Büyükyoncalı is 10072 as of 2011. The settlement was founded in 1861 by the Turks from Crimea who migrated to Turkey after the Crimean War. The settlement was briefly occupied by the Russians in the Russo-Turkish War (1877-1878), by the Bulgarians in the First Balkan War and by the Greeks after the First World War. Büyükyoncalı residents were banished to Milos island in the Aegean Sea. However it was returned to Turkey after the Turkish War of Independence on 1 Nevenber 1922. In 1989, Büyükyoncalı was declared a seat of township. Sunflower, corn and cereals  are the main agricultural crops. Some residents also work in organized industrial sites.

References

Populated places in Tekirdağ Province
Towns in Turkey
Saray District